Tau Piscium (τ Piscium) is an orange-hued star in the zodiac constellation of Pisces. With an apparent visual magnitude of +4.52, it is a dim star but visible to the naked eye. Based upon an annual parallax shift of 19.32 mas as seen from Earth, it is located around 169 light years from the Sun. It is most likely (96% chance) a member of the thin disk population.

This is an evolved K-type giant star with a stellar classification of K0.5 IIIb.  It is about 2.27 billion years and is a red clump star on the horizontal branch, which indicates it is generating energy through helium fusion at its core. The star has 1.7 times the mass of the Sun and has expanded to about 10 times the Sun's radius. It is radiating 45 times the Sun's luminosity from its photosphere at an effective temperature of 4,624 K.

Naming

References

K-type giants
Horizontal-branch stars
Piscium, Tau
Pisces (constellation)
Piscium, 083
Durchmusterung objects
007106
005586
0352